Hades, according to various Christian denominations,  is "the place or state of departed spirits", borrowing the name of Hades, the Greek god of the underworld. It is often associated with the Jewish concept of Sheol.

In the Bible

Septuagint

New Testament

In the Textus Receptus version of the New Testament the word ᾅδης (Hades), appears 11 times; but critical editions of the text of  have θάνατος (death) in place of ᾅδης. Except in this verse of 1 Corinthians, where it uses "grave", the King James Version translates ᾅδης as "hell". Modern translations, for which there are only 10 instances of the word ᾅδης in the New Testament, generally transliterate it as "Hades".

In all appearances but one, ᾅδης has little if any relation to afterlife rewards or punishments . The one exception is Luke's parable of Lazarus and the rich man, in which the rich man finds himself, after death, in Hades, and "in anguish in this flame", while in contrast the angels take Lazarus to "the bosom of Abraham", described as a state of comfort.

Death and Hades are repeatedly associated in the Book of Revelation. The word "Hades" appears in Jesus' promise to Peter: "And I tell you that you are Peter, and on this rock I will build my church, and the gates of Hades will not overcome it." and in the warning to Capernaum: "And you, Capernaum, will you be lifted to the heavens? No, you will go down to Hades."

Early Christian views
Tertullian (c. 160 – c. 225), making an exception only for the Christian martyrs, argued that the souls of the dead go down beneath the earth, and will go up to the sky (heaven) only at the end of the world:

The variously titled fragment "Against Plato" or "De Universo", attributed to Hippolytus of Rome (c. 170 – c. 236), has the following:

In his study, "Hades of Hippolytus or Tartarus of Tertullian? The Authorship of the Fragment De Universo", C. E. Hill argues that the depiction of the intermediate state of the righteous expounded in this text is radically opposed to that found in the authentic works of Hippolytus and must have been written by Tertullian.

In the Coptic Gospel of the Egyptians, an early Gnostic work, the angel Eleleth, with the intent to let something rule over Chaos and Hades, speaks and creates Sophia as a result.

Christian usage in English

In English usage the word "Hades" first appears around 1600, as a transliteration of the Greek word "ᾅδης" in the line in the Apostles' Creed, "He descended into hell", the place of waiting (the place of "the spirits in prison" ) into which Jesus is there affirmed to have gone after the Crucifixion. Because this descent, known in Old and Middle English as the Harrowing of Hell, needed to be distinguished from what had come to be more usually called "hell", i.e. the place or state of those finally damned, the word was transliterated and given a differentiated meaning.

This development whereby "hell" came to be used to mean only the "hell of the damned" affected also the Latin word infernum and the corresponding words in Latin-derived languages, as in the name "Inferno" given to the first part of Dante's Divina Commedia. Greek, on the other hand, has kept the original meaning of  "ᾅδης" (Hades) and uses the word "" (kólasis – literally, "punishment"; cf. , which speaks of "everlasting kolasis") to refer to what nowadays is usually meant by "hell" in English.

Church teachings

Eastern Orthodox 
The teaching of the Eastern Orthodox Church is that, "after the soul leaves the body, it journeys to the abode of the dead (Hades). There are exceptions, such as the Theotokos, who was borne by the angels directly into heaven. As for the rest, we must remain in this condition of waiting. Because some have a prevision of the glory to come and others foretaste their suffering, the state of waiting is called "Particular Judgment". When Christ returns, the soul rejoins its risen body to be judged by Him in the Last judgment. The 'good and faithful servant' will inherit eternal life, the unfaithful with the unbeliever will spend eternity in hell. Their sins and their unbelief will torture them as fire."

The Church of the East, Oriental Orthodoxy, the Eastern Orthodox Church and the Roman Catholic Church, hold that a final Universal Judgment will be pronounced on all human beings when soul and body are reunited in the resurrection of the dead. They also believe that the fate of those in the abode of the dead differs, even while awaiting resurrection: "The souls of the righteous are in light and rest, with a foretaste of eternal happiness; but the souls of the wicked are in a state the reverse of this."

Roman Catholic 
The Latin word infernus or infernum indicated the abode of the dead and so was used as the equivalent of the Greek word "ᾅδης" (hades). It appears in both the documents quoted above, and pointed more obviously than the Greek word to an existence beneath the earth. Later, the transliteration "hades" of the Greek word ceased to be used in Latin and "infernum" became the normal way of expressing the idea of Hades. Although infernus is usually translated into English as "hell", it did not have the narrow sense that the English word has now acquired. It continued to have the generic meaning of "abode of the dead".

For the modern narrow sense the term infernum damnatorum (hell of the damned) was used, as in question 69, article 7 of the Supplement of the Summa Theologica of Thomas Aquinas, which distinguishes five states or abodes of the dead: paradise, hell of the damned, limbo of children, purgatory, and limbo of the Fathers: "The soul separated from the body is in the state of receiving good or evil for its merits; so that after death it is either in the state of receiving its final reward, or in the state of being hindered from receiving it. If it is in the state of receiving its final retribution, this happens in two ways: either in the respect of good, and then it is paradise; or in respect of evil, and thus as regards actual sin it is hell, and as regards original sin it is the limbo of children. On the other hand, if it be in the state where it is hindered from receiving its final reward, this is either on account of a defect of the person, and thus we have purgatory where souls are detained from receiving their reward at once on account of the sins they have committed, or else it is on account of a defect of nature, and thus we have the limbo of the Fathers, where the Fathers were detained from obtaining glory on account of the guilt of human nature which could not yet be expiated."

Anglican 
The Anglican Catechist states that "there is an intermediate state between death and the resurrection, in which the soul does not sleep in unconsciousness, but exists in happiness or misery till the resurrection, when it shall be reunited to the body and receive its final reward." John Henry Hobart, an Anglican bishop, writes that "Hades, or the place of the dead, is represented as a spacious receptacle with gates, through which the dead enter." This space is divided into Paradise and Gehenna "but with an impassable gulf between the two". Souls, with exception of martyrs and saints, remain in Hades until the Final Judgment and "Christians may also improve in holiness after death during the middle state before the final judgment". As such, many Anglicans pray for the dead.

Methodist 
In the Methodist Church, "hades denotes the intermediate state of souls between death and the general resurrection," which is divided into Paradise (for the righteous) and Gehenna (for the wicked). After the general judgment, hades will be abolished. John Wesley, the founder of Methodism, "made a distinction between hell (the receptacle of the damned) and hades (the receptacle of all separate spirits), and also between paradise (the antechamber of heaven) and heaven itself." The dead will remain in Hades "until the Day of Judgment when we will all be bodily resurrected and stand before Christ as our Judge. After the Judgment, the Righteous will go to their eternal reward in Heaven and the Accursed will depart to Hell (see )."

Reformed 
John Calvin held that the intermediate state is conscious and that the wicked suffer in hell.

The dead as unconscious

Several groups of Christians believe in Christian mortalism or "soul sleep" and in the general judgment ("Last Judgment") only. Denominations that see the dead in the intermediate state as not having consciousness include early Unitarians, Christian universalism, Christadelphians, Seventh-day Adventists and Jehovah's Witnesses. These groups also believe that Christ too was dead, unconscious and "asleep" during his time in the grave.

Seventh-day Adventists believe that Hell and Hades are not places of eternal suffering, but of eternal death and that death is a state of unconscious sleep until the resurrection. They also hold that Hell is not an eternal place and that the descriptions of it as "eternal" or "unquenchable" does not mean that the fire will never go out. They base this idea in other biblical cases such as the "eternal fire" that was sent as punishment to the people of Sodom and Gomorrah, that later extinguished.

The Church of England has a variety of views on the death state. Some, such as N. T. Wright have proposed a view of the grave which considers Hades to be a place where the dead sleep, and E. W. Bullinger argued for the cessation of the soul between death and resurrection.

Proponents of the mortality of the soul argue that the story of the rich man and Lazarus is a parable using the framework of Jewish views of the Bosom of Abraham, and is metaphorical, and is not definitive teaching on the intermediate state for several reasons.

See also

 Barzakh
 Discourse to the Greeks concerning Hades
 Greek underworld
 Hell in Christianity
 Purgatory
 Spirit world (Spiritualism)

References

External links
 The International Standard Bible Encyclopaedia: Hades
 The afterlife: Bible references & beliefs of Americans
 The Truth About Death – Comprehensive site covering death in Christian beliefs.
 Browse "Heaven and Hell" Category  at the Cornell University, PJ Mode Collection of Persuasive Cartography

Afterlife in Christianity
Christian terminology
Christianity and Hellenistic religion
Greek underworld